John Dunning Boice Jr. is an American radiation epidemiologist and health physicist.

Life 
Boice was born in Brooklyn, New York in December 1945. His father, John Dunning Boice Sr., served in the United States Army Air Corps. His mother, Irene, was the daughter of a Pennsylvania coal miner. His father's career necessitated frequent moves for the family during Boice's childhood including three years in France. The family settled in El Paso, Texas when he was fourteen. After graduating from Bel Air High School in the city, he enrolled at Texas Western College (now University of Texas at El Paso) graduating in 1967 with a bachelor's degree in physics and mathematics. He went on to receive a master's degree from Rensselaer Polytechnic Institute in nuclear engineering in 1968 and the following year was commissioned as an officer in the US Public Health Service.

During his early years with the Public Health Service, he continued his post-graduate studies at the Harvard School of Public Health, receiving a second master's degree in medical physics in 1974 and his Doctor of Science degree in epidemiology in 1977. His doctoral thesis was entitled Breast cancer and other malignancies following repeated fluoroscopic chest examinations. He went on to develop the Radiation Epidemiology Branch at the National Cancer Institute and became its first director in 1984. Boice retired from the Public Health Service in 1996 with the rank of Captain and became Scientific Director of the International Epidemiology Institute, a biomedical research organization founded in 1994. Since 2000, he has been Professor of Medicine at Vanderbilt University. Since 2012 he has served as President of the National Council on Radiation Protection and Measurements.

Distinguished scientific service
 Radiation Effects Research Foundation, Science Council member
 International Epidemiology Institute, Scientific Director
 International Commission on Radiological Protection commissioner
 National Council on Radiation Protection and Measurements emeritus member
 United Nations Scientific Committee on the Effects of Atomic Radiation, U.S. delegate
 Veterans Advisory Board on Dose Reconstruction, member

Editorial service
 Journal of the National Cancer Institute, Associate Editor
 Journal of Radiological Protection, International Advisor
 , Senior Editor

Awards
 ???? - Distinguished Service Medal from the U.S. Public Health Service
 1994 - Ernest Orlando Lawrence Award from the U.S. Department of Energy
 1994 - Gorgas Medal from the American Military Surgeons of the United States
 1999 - University of Texas at El Paso Distinguished Alumnus Award
 2002 - Health Physics Society R.S. Landauer Memorial Lecturer, Radiation Risks, a Review of What We Know from Medical Radiation Studies
 2007 - Health Physics Society Distinguished Scientific Achievement Award
 2007 - Failla Memorial Lecture from the Greater New York Chapter of the Health Physics Society and the Radiological Medical Physics Society
 2008 - Harvard School of Public Health Alumni Award of Merit
 2009 - NCRP Thirty-Third Lauriston S. Taylor Lecturer

References

American epidemiologists
Cancer epidemiologists
Health physicists
Radiation health effects researchers
National Institutes of Health people
Health Physics Society
Vanderbilt University faculty
Uniformed Services University of the Health Sciences faculty
Rensselaer Polytechnic Institute alumni
Harvard School of Public Health alumni
University of Texas at El Paso alumni
1945 births
Living people
Scientists from Brooklyn
20th-century American scientists
21st-century American scientists